The Princess Diaries is a 2001 American coming-of-age comedy film produced by Walt Disney Pictures and directed by Garry Marshall. Loosely based on Meg Cabot's 2000 young adult novel of the same name, the film was written by Gina Wendkos and stars Anne Hathaway (her feature film debut) and Julie Andrews, with a supporting cast consisting of Héctor Elizondo, Heather Matarazzo, Mandy Moore, Caroline Goodall and Robert Schwartzman. The film follows Mia Thermopolis (Hathaway), a shy American teenager who learns she is heir to the throne of a European kingdom. Under the tutelage of her estranged grandmother (Andrews), the kingdom's reigning queen, Mia must decide whether to claim the throne she has inherited or renounce her title permanently.

Feeling confident about the novel's film potential, Cabot's agent pursued producer Debra Martin Chase about adapting The Princess Diaries into a feature-length film, an idea she pitched to Disney upon reading the book. After obtaining the film rights, Disney originally greenlit the project under the title The Princess of Tribeca, reverting it once its setting was changed from New York to San Francisco, where the majority of the film was shot between September and December 2000. Marshall, who was known for helming several romantic comedies, agreed to direct because he found the story ideal for family entertainment. Despite having little involvement in the film's development, Cabot was consulted about various changes to its story and characters. Hathaway won the lead role over several established young actresses in her motion picture debut, while The Princess Diaries commemorated the end of Andrews' semi-retirement from acting and return to Disney films, her first since Mary Poppins (1964).

Released on August 3, 2001, the film was an unexpected commercial success, grossing over $165 million worldwide. Despite earning mixed reviews for its plot and themes, Hathaway's performance was widely praised by film critics. Ranking among the most profitable films of 2001, The Princess Diaries defied industry expectations as pundits had expected the film to underperform due to its G-rating and subject matter. The film's success is credited with establishing Hathaway as a bankable actress and reviving Andrews' film career. A sequel, The Princess Diaries 2: Royal Engagement, was released in 2004 to similar success. A third installment is currently in development.

Plot

Mia Thermopolis is a student at Grove High School residing with her single mother, Helen, at a refurbished firehouse in San Francisco. Unpopular among her peers, Mia suffers from a fear of public speaking while harboring a crush on Josh Bryant, and is often teased by his popular girlfriend Lana Thomas. Mia's only friends are social outcast Lilly Moscovitz and Lilly's older brother, Michael, who secretly harbors feelings for her.

Mia learns from her estranged paternal grandmother, Clarisse, that she is sole heir to the European kingdom of Genovia, having inherited the throne from her recently deceased father, Philippe. Clarisse is determined to groom Mia into a refined princess so that she may one day rule the kingdom over which Clarisse currently presides. Overwhelmed by the discovery, Mia initially refuses until Helen convinces her to attend her grandmother's "princess lessons" on the condition that she need not make her final decision until the Genovian Independence Day Ball in three weeks' time.

Mia receives a glamorous makeover and a limousine chauffeured by Joe, the queen's head of security and confidant, who becomes a father figure to her. Mia's transformation causes her schoolmates to treat her differently, while her increasingly hectic schedule strains her relationship with Lilly. To appease her best friend, Mia tells Lilly the truth and swears her to secrecy. However, the public soon learns that Mia is a princess after the secret is sold to the press by Paolo, the hairdresser responsible for Mia's makeover, and the paparazzi begins to pursue her relentlessly. Although Mia embarrasses herself at her first state dinner, the queen admits that she found her clumsiness endearing and suggests that they spend quality time together, canceling their lessons for the following afternoon. While bonding, Clarisse explains that although Mia's parents loved each other, they divorced amicably in order to pursue their own passions, Philippe remaining in Genovia to eventually become King, and Helen returning to America with Mia to offer her a "normal" childhood.

As Mia's popularity grows, Josh invites her to attend a beach party with him. Mia accepts, causing her to neglect Lilly and forgo her plans with Michael. The paparazzi ambushes Mia at the beach party. Josh kisses Mia in front of the paparazzi to get his "15 minutes of fame", while Lana helps the paparazzi photograph Mia wearing only a towel; both photographs are printed in the newspaper the following day. Finding the photos inappropriate for a princess, Clarisse admonishes Mia for her behavior, after which a humiliated Mia promises to renounce her title. Joe reminds Clarisse that Mia is still both a teenager and her granddaughter, suggesting that the queen reacted too harshly.

After making amends with Lilly, Mia finally stands up to Lana for bullying a schoolmate. Mia invites both Lilly and Michael to the ball but Michael declines, still heartbroken over Mia's initial dismissal. After Clarisse apologizes to Mia for scolding her, she states that Mia must publicly renounce the throne at the ball. Terrified by the prospect, Mia plans to run away until she discovers a touching letter from her late father and relents. Mia's car malfunctions while driving to the ball, stranding her in a downpour until she is retrieved by Joe.

When they finally arrive, Mia, still wet and untidy from the rain, accepts her role as Princess of Genovia while Clarisse, Helen and Lilly look on proudly. After changing into a gown, Mia accompanies Clarisse into the ballroom where Michael, who has accepted Mia's apology, invites her to dance before proceeding to the courtyard, where they confess their feelings for each other and share their first kiss. In the final scene, Mia is shown traveling to Genovia in a private plane with her pet cat Fat Louie, and writes in her diary that she plans to relocate to Genovia with her mother.

Cast
Order of credits adapted from Variety magazine and Turner Classic Movies:

Production

Development 
The Princess Diaries is based on the young adult novel of the same name by author Meg Cabot. Cabot's agent believed that the first Princess Diaries book had strong film potential, and pursued film producer Debra Martin Chase, who had recently co-produced the television film Rodgers & Hammerstein's Cinderella (1997), about adapting the book into a film due to their similar "rags-to-riches" and "Cinderella-type" themes. Chase highly enjoyed the book and convinced Disney to adapt the novel into a feature-length production. Disney chairman Peter Schneider optioned the project in an "effort to re-establish the Disney brand for live-action family films". Cabot was thrilled to learn that Disney was interested in her book, the film rights for which the studio paid her $4,000, although some media outlets reported that Cabot had been offered "mid- to low-six figures". Cabot recalled that Disney's decision to adapt The Princess Diaries resulted in her getting promoted at her own job, prior to which she had struggled to convince publishers to publish her novel, the content of which some found inappropriate for young readers. Several publishers had rejected Cabot's manuscript before HarperCollins showed interest in 1999, followed by Disney shortly afterward.

By August 1999, the film was greenlit by Disney, who agreed to produce it with singer Whitney Houston's BrownHouse Productions, and Cabot's manuscript was forwarded to potential screenwriters. The Princess Diaries was Houston's first feature film production venture, and her studio's second film after Rodgers & Hammerstein's Cinderella. Chase developed the script with screenwriter Gina Wendkos. Although Cabot did not write the screenplay herself, she worked closely with Chase to discuss changes deemed necessary to translate the story from page to screen, maintaining that "The essence of the story, or the message, of staying true to yourself ... still comes through". Garry Marshall was enlisted as director, with Houston and Chase producing alongside Mario Iscovich. Marshall was invited to direct the project while he himself had been pitching ideas to Disney executive Nina Jacobson. Connecting with the material, Marshall found the story enjoyable for entire families, and was particularly drawn towards the idea of "a young girl turning into a woman and realizing that she can have a positive effect on the world". Marshall elaborated, "I wanted to do a fairy tale for the fairy tale crowd, which are the young girls and boys", hoping that the project to crossover to adult audiences as well. Furthermore, the director admitted to being fond of "female wish-fulfillment and empowerment movies". However, Marshall nearly declined to work on the film due to a typo in the original treatment that read "The Princess Dairies", joking, "I thought it was a movie about privileged cows!" Houston and Chase hoped that The Princess Diaries would be BrownHouse Productions' first in a series of female-led wish-fulfillment films, originally planning to remake the musical film Sparkle (1976) as a follow up. Chase recalled that, at the time, Hollywood believed that while girls would willingly see a film intended for boys, it was difficult to convince boys to see a female-oriented film, but were encouraged by the success of Disney's The Parent Trap (1998).

The Princess Diaries was optioned to challenge the belief that children were losing interest in live-action films targeted towards girls, and Marshall was hired specifically to make a G-rated film "edgy and crazy and maybe something the adults will like". The film differs considerably from the novel. Initially intended to be set in New York like Cabot's book, the film was originally called The Princess of Tribeca. The title was reverted once the setting was changed to San Francisco, California, a decision Marshall made because the latter is home to both himself and his granddaughters, to whom the film is dedicated. Although Mia and Lilly remain environmentally and politically conscious, the filmmakers softened some of the more political aspects of their personalities to prevent the film from resembling "a political diatribe". Some aspects of the script were inspired by Cabot's own childhood, particularly when her mother began dating one of her teachers shortly after her father's death. Despite being consulted about such changes, Cabot preferred to distance herself from the creative process to preserve her own mental health in fear of compromising her vision for future novels, insisting that the book and film exist in separate universes. Cabot maintains that she had little creative input in the film, elaborating, "I don't think Garry Marshall needs 'help' to make a movie… from a novelist who has absolutely no experience in film-making." Although Cabot admitted that Disney consulted with her before making changes, she described their conversations as more informative than collaborative. Cabot acknowledged the challenge of adapting a 300-page novel, which she had written in the form of a diary, into a 90-page screenplay but was ultimately satisfied with the final results and Marshall's direction.

Casting

Chase decided that, in terms of ethnicity, the film's cast would remain faithful to the novel due to Mia and Clarisse ruling a European country, and Chase preferring to "make good movies" as opposed to limiting herself to African-American films. Anne Hathaway was cast in the lead role of Mia Thermopolis after Juliette Lewis, to whom the part had originally been offered, turned it down. Aged eighteen at the time, The Princess Diaries was Hathaway's first major film role, for which she auditioned during a 26-hour layover in Los Angeles, California while traveling to New Zealand to film The Other Side of Heaven (2001). Her only prior acting credit had been in the short-lived television series Get Real. Hathaway was very nervous during her audition, to the point at which she fell out of her chair; her inherent clumsiness is credited with impressing Marshall. Several established young actresses had been considered for the role, including Reese Witherspoon, Kirsten Dunst, Alicia Silverstone, Jessica Biel, Claire Danes, Kate Hudson, Cameron Diaz, Drew Barrymore, Sarah Michelle Gellar, Brittany Murphy, Katie Holmes, Christina Applegate, Kate Beckinsale and Eva Mendes, while Liv Tyler was deemed a front-runner. Christy Carlson Romano was unable to audition due to scheduling conflicts while filming the Disney Channel series Even Stevens. Marshall's granddaughters ultimately convinced the director to cast Hathaway over Tyler because they felt that she possessed the more "princess-like hair".

The actress was cast based on her sole audition without performing a screen test. Although Marshall believed that several other actresses seemed capable of embodying Mia's comedic aspects, he determined that only Hathaway possessed "the grace and authority" to deliver the character's final speech. Hathaway identified with her character's struggles and personality, explaining, "Mia was very similar to the person I was in high school", describing herself as a wallflower to whom few paid attention and appreciating the opportunity to be herself in a film. For Marshall, Hathaway's appearance and performance were reminiscent of Julia Roberts, whom he had directed to great success in the romantic comedy Pretty Woman (1990), describing her as a fusion of Roberts and comedian Harpo Marx due to her combination of glamour and physical comedy, which he also likened to his own sister Penny Marshall. Hathaway gained weight for the role to closer resemble "a regular teen". The actress credits Marshall with teaching her the most important lesson of her career: "You never know what's going to be a hit, so you might as well have fun making it."
Julie Andrews, who had been semi-retired from acting at the time, was cast as Clarisse Renaldi, Mia's grandmother and Queen of Genovia. Marshall personally invited Andrews to discuss the film with him; Andrews identified the director as "the hook" that convinced her to accept the role, having been a long-time fan of his work. She accepted the role based solely on her conversations with Marshall without reading Wendkos' script. Although Sophia Loren is rumored to have been offered the role, Marshall insists that Andrews is the first and only actress he considered, having been a fan of hers since Broadway's My Fair Lady (1956). Known for portraying princesses and nobility throughout her career, Andrews incorporated knowledge she had acquired about European royalty and mannerisms of Britain's royal family into her performance as Mia's regal mentor; Queen Elizabeth II herself had knighted Andrews one year prior, making her a Dame of the British Empire. Marshall allowed Andrews significant freedom to determine Clarisse's portrayal. Cabot was initially hesitant about Andrews' casting, fearing that the actress was too kind to play such a stern character, but ultimately relented upon seeing her interpretation, explaining that Andrews possessed "just the right amount of regalness mixed with grandmotherly warmth". Andrews also used the opportunity to mentor Hathaway, although she maintains that the younger actress required very little training: "She has great instincts, good talent ... She has this ability to do humor, comedy, very well. So other than actually honing her craft and learning from the doing, she has it all.” The Princess Diaries was Andrews' first Disney film since Mary Poppins (1964), the role for which she had won an Academy Award for Best Actress 37 years prior, and her first feature film in 15 years.

Marshall cast Heather Matarazzo as Mia's best friend Lilly Moscovitz after casting director Marcia Ross introduced them to each other, insisting that Matarazzo is different from other actresses. Matarazzo attended a chemistry reading with Hathaway after auditioning for Marshall; Hathaway believes that the two actresses had met each other several times prior, none of which Matarazzo remembers, expounding, "I was such a sarcastic, little punk-ass kid that couldn't be bothered by cheerfulness" while "She's such a warmhearted, beautiful, sweet, soulful woman". Matarazzo insists that they got along well despite their differences, likening their on-screen chemistry to Richard Gere and Roberts' in Pretty Woman. Furthermore, the actress cites Marshall as her favourite director, whose positive energy she described as unrivaled by other directors. Matarazzo was also starstruck by the opportunity to work with Andrews, whose films she had idolized as a child, and often asked for the actress' autograph.

Héctor Elizondo was cast as Joe, Mia's limousine driver and Clarisse's head of security. Elizondo is known for appearing in all 18 films Marshall directed. Singer Mandy Moore was cast as Mia's school rival Lana Thomas, her first credited film role. Marshall was the first film director with whom Moore, sixteen years old at the time, ever worked; she recalled that the director "had no business casting me ... I didn't know what I was doing. So I think the highlight of the film was working with him." Moore also appreciated the fact that most of her co-stars were similar to her in age, crediting the overall experience with setting her acting career "in motion". Robert Schwartzman was cast as Michael, Mia's love interest and Lilly's brother. His real-life band Rooney has a cameo appearance as garage band Flypaper, with Schwartzman playing their lead singer. The musicians perform "Blueside", one of Rooney's original songs. Schwartzman wanted to change his last name in the credits to Cage in honor of his cousin Nicolas Cage, but the film's promotional material had already been finalized. The Princess Diaries remains Schwartzman's only major film role.

Marshall cast several of his own family members in supporting and minor roles. Kathleen Marshall, Marshall's daughter, plays Clarisse's secretary Charlotte Kutaway. Charlotte's surname is finally revealed during the closing credits; Marshall explained that the character was named after how often she is used in cutaway shots, and her role references the filmmaking technique in which "whenever anything goes wrong in the film, you cut away to someone". Marshall's wife appears as a ball guest, while his twin granddaughters Lily and Charlotte, the same granddaughters who inspired him to cast Hathaway, appear as a pair of schoolgirls asking for Mia's autograph. Marshall himself has a brief cameo during the Genovian Independence Day Ball, alongside sister Penny. San Francisco Mayor Willie Brown portrayed himself in a cameo appearance, during which he is briefly interviewed upon arriving at the same ball.

Further writing 
Further adjustments were made to finesse the script once the cast was finalized. Marshall was constantly conceiving new ways to make the film funnier, as Disney had challenged him to incorporate humor into the G-rated film. Marshall's approach to the film's humor was reminiscent of his television contributions to shows such as Happy Days and The Odd Couple, the original scripts for which he revisited to remind himself how to approach family-oriented comedies. Matarazzo described the set as a collaborative environment, recalling that Marshall encouraged a family-like atmosphere abiding by his motto "Life is more important than show business." Marshall would sometimes hold parades for the entire crew, particularly when it was a cast or crew members' birthday. The director celebrated his own birthday while filming, during which Houston herself serenaded him with a rendition of "Happy Birthday". The character of Mia's grandmother, nicknamed "Grandmere" in the novel, is depicted as considerably kinder in the film. Disney's decision to have Mia's father be deceased in the film is among the most significant deviations from its source material, in which he is both alive and has an integral role. The producers decided to kill off Mia's father in favor of expanding her grandmother's role, which they had been considering offering to Andrews from the beginning. Upon learning that Disney was interested in casting a "big name" actress such as Andrews in the role, Cabot approved that Mia's father be eliminated, much of whose dialogue was re-written for Mia's grandmother. Marshall wrote Hathaway's childhood struggles with speaking while wearing a retainer into the film; the actress filmed a scene wearing the same retainer she had worn as a child. Elizondo and Andrews campaigned for a romantic relationship between their characters, an idea that originated during a table reading in which the actors uttered "you're cute" to each other. The actors improvised their dance sequence. Elizondo credits this with evolving his character into more than simply "a guy who drove a limo".

Upon Marshall's request, Andrews suggested that the fictional country of Genovia be famous for its pears, after which point the set was decorated with artificial pears and pear-shaped statues. Marshall worked with Larry Miller, who portrays Mia's hair stylist Paolo, to improvise humour moments, such as shrieking upon seeing Mia for the first time and drawing his styling tools from his pockets as though they are pistols. Wendkos wrote that Miller's Paolo was deliberately written as an "over-the-top" character. "Not you, I don't even know you", one of Matarazzo's most oft-quoted lines which she utters to someone while running down the street, was entirely improvised at the suggestion of Chase. Joe recites "No one can make you feel inferior without your consent" to Mia, a famous quote originally by former United States First Lady Eleanor Roosevelt. Mia recites one of Juliet's soliloquies from William Shakespeare's Romeo and Juliet, a deliberate reference to the fact that Hathaway shares her full name with Shakespeare's wife. Houston conceived the scene in which Mia smears her ice cream cone on Lana's cheerleader uniform. Wendkos spent more effort revising Mia's makeover sequence than any other scene in the filming, wanting to achieve a "clearer progression from the ugly duckling to the ingenue", as per Marshall's request.

The film contains several references to Pretty Woman, another film directed by Marshall to which The Princess Diaries has often been compared. In addition to sharing a "Pygmalion-esque transformation story", both films share several cast members. Both Elizondo and Miller had appeared in Pretty Woman. Most notably, actor Alan Kent, portraying a waiter, delivers the same line he once delivered to Julia Roberts' character in Pretty Woman during the scene in which Mia accidentally breaks a glass.

Filming

Set and locations 
The Princess Diaries was filmed on a budget of $26 million. Principal photography took place from September to December 2000, with filming beginning one month before Cabot's novel was published. It was filmed on Stage 2 at Walt Disney Studios in Burbank, California, the same sound stage on which Mary Poppins, which starred Andrews in the titular role, had been filmed during the 1960s. The stage was later renamed the "Julie Andrews Stage" in honor of the actress' contributions. Andrews recalled having to constantly walk up and down the set's main staircase while struggling to remain regal and composed in appearance. Additionally, Marshall resided in the same house that Andrews herself had rented while filming Mary Poppins, having lived in the building since 1974. Marshall joked that he and the actress had "amazing" karma due to sharing several similarities and coincidences. The Washington Post contributor Kristal Brent Zook remarked that Marshall and Andrews have also "proved themselves masters of the modern fairy tale" due to both of their repertoires consisting largely of romantic, Cinderella-themed material.

The film was shot on several locations throughout California, with Alverno High School serving as Mia's private school Grove High School. A refurbished fire station named Engine Company No. 43 was used as Mia and Helen's home, located on Brazil Avenue. In 2014, the building was listed for sale at $2.6 million. Mount St. Mary's College, formerly the Doheny Mansion, was used as the location for The Genovian Consulate. Unlike much of the film, which was filmed in San Francisco, the beach party sequence was filmed in Malibu. The production designers decorated Malibu's Zuma Beach to resemble San Francisco's Baker Beach.

To help Hathaway feel more comfortable on set, many of its props belonged to the actress' family. Mia's photograph of her late father is a photograph of Hathaway's own father, Gerald Hathaway. Gerald also briefly portrays the character during a flashback sequence in which he writes a letter to Mia. Mia's pet cat Fat Louie was portrayed by four different cats, one of whom was owned by Hathaway herself. Each cat served a different purpose: one was meant to be carried, another sat still for extended periods of time, a third was used for jumping and stunts, and the final (Hathaway's) is featured during the film's final scene. During the state dinner in which a guest's arm catches fire, the fire was intended to be extinguished once the actor placed his arm in a nearby ice bucket. However, when the fire persisted, Hathaway panicked and doused it with a glass of water, an improvisation that was kept in the film. Hathaway tripped and fell while filming a scene in which she is walking atop bleachers during the rain, but continued to recite her lines as though nothing had happened. Marshall found the unscripted incident funny and decided to retain it. Matarazzo, who had been filming the scene with Hathaway, identified this moment as "a testament to the kind of person that she is, not just professionally but personally… You fall, you laugh, and you keep going". She also identified this as her favorite moment while filming. While filming the final dance sequence, the crew played Madonna's "Like a Prayer" (1989) for the cast to dance to; multiple takes were required because the cast kept instinctively lip syncing its lyrics. The track was dubbed by a different song in the final edit.

Costume design 
Costume designer Gary Jones, who had worked with Marshall prior, was drawn to the film due to the wide range of costumes required for its characters, describing the project as "a costume designer's dream come true". Jones worked closely with Andrews while designing Clarisse's costumes, drawing inspiration from Chanel, Bill Blass, and Christian Dior. The gown Andrews wears to the state dinner is an homage to her stage role as My Fair Lady's Eliza Doolittle, which was handmade in China. Jones envisioned Mia as a character who is shy about her body at first, opting to dress her in layers consisting of long sleeves and loose-fitting clothing. The actress' periwinkle state dinner gown was inspired by a dress worn by Princess Victoria of Sweden, with Jones describing it as "a bow to the Renaissance and Romeo and Juliet," accessorizing it with an 18-carat diamond ring.

Both Hathaway and Andrews' tiaras were designed and custom-made specifically for their respective actresses, with the designers ensuring that both characters' crowns were appropriate for their age. The tiara and jewelry Andrews wears during the final scene consists of half a million dollars’ worth of diamonds, loaned to the production by jeweler Harry Winston, with whom Jones worked closely to obtain several unique jewels. A security guard followed Andrews at all times to both protect her and ensure that all jewels were returned at the end of each day. Andrews' peach taffeta ballgown was accessorized with a 100-carat necklace comprising four rows of diamonds. Hathaway's tiara was considerably less expensive, consisting of cubic zirconia as opposed to authentic jewels. The crowns and tiaras worn by both actresses are preserved by the Walt Disney Archives, into which they were inducted in 2016 to commemorate the film's 15th anniversary.

Hathaway donned false eyebrows and a wig to make her character's makeover more dramatic. Hathaway's hair piece was nicknamed "The Beast", while her eyebrows required one hour to apply; each strand of hair was glued to her brow individually. At times Hathaway was required to leave the set in full costume, claiming that she "never felt so alone in [her] entire life".

Themes 

Andrews explained that the film is as much "about what you are inside and the responsibility and just plain old hard work that goes into being a princess" as it is "about the trappings of being a princess". Hathaway identified "remaining true to yourself" among the film's core values, describing Mia's transformation as both emotional and psychological, in addition to physical. Hathaway elaborated that, despite the makeover, her character most importantly learns that "life shouldn't be about what the rest of the world can do for her" but rather "doing everything in her power to help other people", emphasizing her emotional transformation over her physical one. Chase regards the plot as an "empowerment story", identifying "the power to be anything that you want to be" as its core message. Chase elaborated, "In the beginning, Mia looks in the mirror and doesn't think she's princess material at all" but ultimately "comes to believe that she is". Houston echoed that being a princess "doesn't mean they have to come from royalty" but rather "how you feel inside about yourself it's how you treat yourself and love yourself that really matters." Bustle contributor Veronica Walsingham wrote that the film explores feminism, identity, family, girlhood, and duty, believing that The Princess Diaries "is a feminist dream of fully developed female characters whose arcs aren't dependent on male characters", additionally passing the Bechdel test. A critic for Time Out wrote that the film discusses "responsibility, surrogacy, rites of passage and the value of friendship".

Most of Marshall's films revolve around themes "of recognizing and embracing one's own unique qualities and gifts". The Globe and Mail's Liam Lacey observed that the film adheres to a traditional fairy tale plot: "a fairy godmother, and the lowly girl who becomes a princess, complete with tiara, the dress and a plump frog to be transformed into Prince Charming". The Princess Diaries has been noted to contain some romantic comedy elements. The film has also drawn comparisons to Pygmalion, a play that provided the basis for the stage musical My Fair Lady, in which Andrews coincidentally originated the role of Eliza Doolittle; Mia has been compared to Eliza. Identifying Pygmalion as "the model for all subsequent dramas about the recreation of social identity", The Guardian film critic Philip French cited The Princess Diaries as one of several "makeover drama[s]" inspired by the play. Similarly, HuffPost contributor Matthew recognized the film among several "recent approaches" to the Pygmalion story. Jacobs Kristal Brent Zook of The Washington Post wrote that Clarisse "must ... remake the gawky girl into a vision of regal grace" in "true Henry Higgins fashion", a character from My Fair Lady. The Seattle Times film critic Moira Macdonald joked that Andrews "play[s] Henry Higgins to young Anne Hathaway's Eliza". Also writing for The Washington Post, Michael O'Sullivan similarly observed that "Most of the comedy mileage comes from the My Fair Lady scenario, in which Mia's initially frumpy appearance and klutzy manner are eliminated through a regime of industrial-strength cosmetology and boot camp-style finishing school."

Nanciann Cherry, writing for The Blade, reviewed the film as "no more and no less than a live-action Cinderella, all dolled up for the 21st century". Amy Meadows, writing for The Tech, remarked that the film would hold few surprises for anyone who has seen Cinderella, My Fair Lady, or any other fairy tale. The film's main characters react differently towards Mia's physical transformation; Lilly fears that Mia will abandon her, Michael's attraction towards her only grows, and Lana feels threatened by Mia's royal lineage and sudden popularity within her own school. Some critics were concerned that the film's message might encourage younger viewers "that all awkward teens need do to find contentment is get a makeover and wait for a hitherto unknown royal grandmother to come lay a crown on their heads."

Music
Houston and BrownHouse Productions were heavily involved in curating music for the film, which Kristal Brent Zook of The Washington Post observed "displays more girl power and ethnic flavor than the film does". Dawn Soler served as the film's music supervisor, and Moore recorded a cover of Connie Francis' "Stupid Cupid" for the soundtrack. Composer John Debney was recruited to score the film. Long-time friends with Disney executive Bill Green, Green felt that Debney would complement the film and personally recommended him to Marshall. Debney identified The Princess Diaries as one of the films he is most proud to have worked on, explaining that the project holds an "emotional connection" because it reminds him of his mother.

The official soundtrack was released by Walt Disney Records on July 24, 2001. Described as largely a collection of pop rock, teen pop, and dance-pop tracks, the soundtrack features contributions from artists BBMak, Aaron Carter, Backstreet Boys, Myra, Hanson and B*Witched. AllMusic's Heather Phares reviewed that the album consists of mostly "slick, virtually interchangeable singles ... a few tracks, for better or worse, are particularly distinctive", and felt that the album could have benefited from more originality as the Backstreet Boys' track "What Makes You Different (Makes You Beautiful)" implies. A soundtrack consisting exclusively of the film's orchestral score was released on December 11, 2001, credited to Debney.

Release

Disney attempted to market the film cleverly to dispel the stigma associated with G-rated films at the time. The Princess Diaries premiered on July 29, 2001, at the El Capitan Theatre. Prior to introducing the film, Marshall encouraged audience members to chant "G is a good rating", deliberately referencing the lack of G-rated films released that year. A princess-themed tea party was hosted following the screening, with cast members Andrews, Hathaway, Matarazzo, Moore, Goodall, Schwartzman, Von Detten and Burbano attending. In addition to Jacobson, Disney executives Bob Iger, Richard Cook, Mark Vahradian, Chuck Viane and Oren Aviv were present, as well as actors Spencer Treat Clark, David Hasselhoff, Jennifer Love Hewitt and Michelle Trachtenberg. Additionally, the tea party featured appearances by actors portraying well-known Disney Princesses, including Snow White, Cinderella, Aurora and Belle.

Disney postponed the release of The Other Side of Heaven, which Hathaway had filmed before The Princess Diaries, to allow the latter film to take precedence at the box office, feeling confident that The Princess Diaries' impending success would in turn bolster the performance of The Other Side of Heaven. The Princess Diaries was released in theaters on August 3, 2001, becoming a surprise success and sleeper hit. The film opened in 2,537 theaters throughout North America and earned more than $23.2 million during its opening weekend, completing in third place behind Rush Hour 2 and Planet of the Apes. The Princess Diaries achieved the second-highest opening earnings for a live-action G-rated film, behind 101 Dalmatians (1996) at $33.5 million. The film's box office returns surprised several commentators, far exceeding pundits' expectations. Analysts originally estimated that the film would earn between $13 and $15 million.

The Princess Diaries was the only G-rated film released during summer 2001. According to Breuse Hickman of The Honolulu Advertiser, the last live-action film to earn a G-rating prior to The Princess Diaries was Disney's 101 Dalmatians in 1996, a live-action remake of their own 1961 animated film of the same name. ABC News believes that the comedy's strong opening numbers benefited from it being one of 2001's few G-rated releases amidst several of PG-13-and R-rated films, to which parents reportedly rushed to see with their children, while Allen Wan of MarketWatch joked that the family friendly rating "didn't scare off mature audiences". However, The Dove Foundation argued that family fare such as The Princess Diaries is typically 11 times more profitable than adult-oriented films, although 12 times as many R-rated films were released between 1989 and 2003. Dove Foundation CEO Dick Rolfe received the film's release as "an experiment to test the waters to see if there is a market for truly wholesome family entertainment at the theaters". The Princess Diaries ultimately grossed $165.3 million worldwide, collecting $108.2 million in the United States and Canada, and $57.1 million in other territories. The film's box office returns were deemed remarkably high considering the fact that its lead role was played by a newcomer. The film ranks among the highest-grossing and most profitable of 2001.

To commemorate the film's 10th anniversary in April 2012, the film was released on Blu-ray to coincide with Disney's National Princess Week and the release of Andrews' book The Very Fairy Princess: Here Comes The Flower Girl!. A double-disk paired with The Princess Diaries 2: Royal Engagement, the release was sold exclusively at Target.

Critical response
The Princess Diaries earned mixed reviews from film critics upon release. Review aggregator Rotten Tomatoes reports that 49% of 117 critics surveyed reviewed the film positively, with an average rating of 5.30/10. The website's critical consensus reads, "A charming, if familiar, makeover movie for young teenage girls." Metacritic assigned the film a weighted score of 52 based on 27 reviews, indicating "Mixed or average reviews". Ed Park, writing for The Village Voice, reviewed the film as "a modest, enjoyable fairy tale that easily outcharms its animated stablemates of the past decade", continuing, "The movie hits its timeworn marks with grace and wit, thanks to game gamine Hathaway and an effortlessly regal Andrews." Calling The Princess Diaries "an ideal family film", Kevin Thomas of the Los Angeles Times commended Marshall's ability to "mak[e] make-believe seem real" while describing Wendkos' screenplay as "skillfully adapted" and praising Andrews' performance. Awarding the film a B+, Entertainment Weekly film critic Lisa Schwarzbaum wrote that Marshall "directs Gina Wendkos' girl-wise script ... with avuncular affection and, by his standards, a minimum of court jestering, and he encourages moments of appropriate delirium among his large cast", highlighting Andrews and Oh's contributions and dubbing it a "charming ... production" that "gets the duckling-to-swan ambivalence just right".

Film critic Mick LaSalle, writing for SFGate, called the film superior to Marshall's Pretty Woman, going on to deem it "Marshall's best movie". Dubbing Clarisse "Andrews' best showcase in years", LaSalle credited most of the film's humor with Andrews' performance, specifically her reaction to Hathaway's gimmicks. The Washington Post film critic Michael O'Sullivan wrote that, despite the film's younger target demographic, "there's enough bile and phlegm souring up the sweet main story to appeal to even those of us with more mature tastes." Although Christine Dolen of the Miami Herald believed Mia's clumsiness is "by far the most winning things about" the film, she felt that the script "leaves much to be desired -- like an intriguing storyline, any semblance of believability or choices beyond the obvious". She ultimately credited Andrews and Hathaway's performances with saving the picture. Robert Koehler of Variety felt Marshall and Wendkos "waste the charming comic tone and observations of Cabot's book, especially ... where the reformation of Mia is depicted almost off-handedly". Koehler criticized the film for squandering comedic opportunities by focusing on Mia's school and romantic relationships as opposed to her grandmother's training. However, he felt Andrews and Elizondo were perfectly cast, and commended Hathaway's comedic instincts. The Globe and Mail's Liam Lacey agreed that "Surprisingly little time is spent mining the comic potential of Mia's education, with the comedy rationed in favour of a tiresome amount of attention lavished on her ongoing school problems", but concluded that Marshall deserves "credit for his keen sense of historical symmetry in the perfect casting of Julie Andrews". Praising the cast's chemistry, Loren King, writing for the Chicago Tribune, credited Andrews' performance with "kick[ing] the film's class quotient up several notches".

Hathaway's performance was widely praised by film critics, as was her chemistry with Andrews. LaSalle wrote, "Hathaway is not a natural comic, but her acting has a truthfulness that gives The Princess Diaries its emotional core. She is also a chameleon, who, from the most unpromising of beginnings, blossoms before our eyes into near- Audrey Hepburn-level loveliness", additionally commending her chemistry with Matarazzo. Elvis Mitchell, film critic for The New York Times, found the film to be merely "a blandly reassuring comedy" but described it as perfectly cast, hailing Hathaway as "royalty in the making, a young comic talent with a scramble of features". However, Mitchell felt that her character becomes less interesting once she undergoes her makeover and predicted that some viewers will find the sequence problematic. Similarly, The Seattle Times' Moira Macdonald felt that the film could have done without Mia's "teen-queen makeover, which made her look alarmingly like a junior Julia Roberts", but wrote that Andrews "tucks the film into her carpet bag and walks away with it", crowning her "pure screen royalty".

Even the film's most staunch detractors enjoyed Hathaway's efforts, with several critics comparing Hathaway to a "young" Julia Roberts. Lacey felt Mia "does a reasonable impression of a fashion model going through a geek-chic phase", comparing her to Roberts and predicting her successful film career. Asher Price, reviewing for The Denver Post, lauded Andrews' contribution while identifying Hathaway as "a good match for" the veteran actress. Branding the film "a surprisingly sophisticated comedy" that avoids common teen tropes, Price enjoyed the training sequences but felt Mia's confidence is drawn solely from her physical transformation, describing the latter as "The only disturbing part of the film". Despite being unimpressed with his direction, the New York Post film critic Lou Lumenick commended Marshall for "showcas[ing] Hathaway’s star quality in a way that’s more than a little reminiscent of his most famous film, Pretty Woman" and praised Elizondo's contribution. ReelViews' James Berardinelli panned the film, accusing Marshall of exploring a predictable plot "in a thoroughly uninteresting way" by "reducing characters to types and heaping mounds of saccharine and false sentiment on top".  Film critic Roger Ebert dismissed the film as a "swamp of recycled ugly duckling stories, with occasional pauses in the marsh of sitcom cliches and the bog of Idiot Plots", finding it predictable, poorly edited and Hathaway too physically attractive to offer a convincing transformation. Salon film critic Stephanie Zacharek reviewed the film as "so aggressively bland and inoffensive that it practically recedes from the screen". Zacharek is also one of the few film critics to deride the leads' performances, dismissing Andrews as "so shellacked and precise ... that it makes you want to run out of the theater and roll around in the dirt".

Accolades
The Princess Diaries won the Young Artist Award for Best Family Feature Film - Comedy. Debney's score won the ASCAP Award for Top Box Office Film, one of three awards the composer received at the 17th Film and Television Music Awards ceremony. Myra's song "Miracles Happen (When You Believe)" received an ALMA Award nomination for Outstanding Song in a Motion Picture Soundtrack. Casting directors Marcia Ross, Donna Morong and Gail Goldberg were nominated for an Artios Award for Feature Film Casting – Comedy.

At the Broadcast Film Critics Association Awards, The Princess Diaries was nominated for Best Family Film - Live Action. The film's trailer was nominated for a Golden Trailer Award for Best Animation/Family. Makeup artists Hallie D'Amore and Leonard Engelma were nominated for a Hollywood Makeup Artist Hair Stylist Guild Award for Best Contemporary Makeup - Feature. Hathaway received an MTV Movie Award nomination for Breakthrough Female Performance. The Princess Diaries was nominated for two Teen Choice Awards: Choice Movie: Actress, Comedy for Hathaway and Choice Movie: Comedy.

Sequel

A sequel, The Princess Diaries 2: Royal Engagement, was released on August 11, 2004, with Garry Marshall returning to direct, Debra Martin Chase and Whitney Houston would produce the sequel. Unlike the first film, it is not based on any of the books. Most of the cast returned for the sequel, including Anne Hathaway, Julie Andrews, Héctor Elizondo, Heather Matarazzo, and Larry Miller. New cast and characters include Viscount Mabrey (John Rhys-Davies), Lord Nicholas Devereaux (Chris Pine), and Andrew Jacoby (Callum Blue). There had been constant speculation about whether or not a third film would be released for several years. Several cast members had expressed interest in returning for a third installment, particularly Hathaway and Andrews. In 2016, Marshall revealed that he had discussed the possibility of having a third film set in New York with both actresses. Interest had bolstered following Marshall's death in 2016, with Cabot revealing that a script for the third film already exists, indicating that the threequel would most likely be a tribute to Marshall.

In January 2019, Hathaway confirmed there is a script being written for a third film and that she, Julie Andrews, and producer Debra Martin Chase are on board. However, Andrews said in a June 2022 interview that she felt a third film would be unlikely and too late, especially since Marshall had already died.

On November 15, 2022, it was reported that Aadrita Mukerji was writing a script for a third Princess Diaries film, as a continuation of the previous films.
Neither Hathaway nor Andrews had been confirmed to return.

Legacy 

Elite Daily contributor Alana Altmann described the film as "a bonafide fave of '90s and 2000s kids alike". Writing for the same publication, Kristen Perrone called the film "an essential part of the childhoods of anyone who grew up in the early 2000s". Andrews attributes the film's longevity to the notion that a new generation discovers it "every seven years". The actress believes the film continues to resonate with audiences "because it’s got a wonderful heart. It’s about responsibility and obligation and decency and growing up and discovering who you are inside." Seventeen ranked The Princess Diaries the 10th best "Best Teen Movies You Can't Grow Up Without Watching". The scene in which Mia undergoes a physical makeover has garnered significant attention, with several media publications ranking it among the greatest makeover sequences in film history. E! contributor McKenna Aiello identified the montage as "the first scene that comes to mind" when remembering The Princess Diaries, a sentiment with which InStyle agreed. Lauren Hubbard, writing for Allure, believes the film "may very well be one of the single greatest makeover movies of our generation",  publishing a list of "11 Beauty Lessons We Learned from The Princess Diaries". Cosmopolitan'''s Eliza Thompson wrote "Few makeover movies hold up as well as The Princess Diaries". Katie Rosseinsky of Grazia credits the film with introducing "one of the best makeover sequences in teen movie history" while teaching "excellent life lessons". Ranking it second, Her Campus hailed the scene as "the best teenage makeover ever". Total Beauty ranked the montage ninth, dubbing it the "Best Hair Movie Makeover".Bustle writer Veronica Walsingham believes that The Princess Diaries' makeover sequence distinguishes itself from similar scenes because "it's an actual makeover" involving a complete physical transformation, whereas several other films "feature a female character who is made over by ... taking off her glasses". The Ringer placed the scene seventh on their "Definitive Ranking of the Best Movie Makeovers", with author Andrew Gruttadaro calling Mia's final reveal from behind two photographs of her former self a highlight. When rumors of a third installment of the series were denied by Disney in 2015, Entertainment Weekly editor Isabella Biedenharn advised disappointed fans to seek comfort by watching the original film's makeup sequence. The sequence's popularity has resulted in makeover sequences becoming something of a trademark for Hathaway, whose characters have undergone similar transformations in subsequent films such as Ella Enchanted (2004), The Devil Wears Prada (2006) and Les Misérables (2012), with some media publications crowning her the "queen of makeover movies". The mint sorbet Mia consumes as a palate cleanser during the state dinner has frequently been commented upon in the media. Describing the dessert as "the element of the movie that has always stood out the most", Priya Krishna, a food writer for The Cut, reported that since the film's release, food bloggers have attempted to recreate the dessert and celebrities have commented upon it on social media, concluding, "nothing ... has been so simultaneously mystifying and fascinating to me as the palate cleanser in The Princess Diaries", crediting it with inspiring her career trajectory. Zimbio ranked the confection one of the "Top 20 Movie Desserts Of All Time".

In her biography for Hathaway, Rebecca Flint Marx of AllMovie wrote that Hathaway "became a familiar face to millions of moviegoers thanks to her starring role in" The Princess Diaries by "prov[ing] her comedic timing" and in turn opening "a number of doors" for her as a performer. Hathaway suffered from being typecast in "good girl" roles in Hollywood, and struggled to pursue more serious, non-princess roles; this would inspire her to pursue a wider range of films as possible. Hathaway explained that "Because I became so associated with The Princess Diaries ... my main [criterion] is to look for the opposite of what I last did.” Hathaway commemorates the film's release date every year, thanking "the universe ... because that was the day that dreams came true for me". Marie Claire ranked The Princess Diaries Hathaway's second greatest film performance, describing the "SHUT UP" her character utters upon discovering she's a princess as iconic. The website NewNowNext credits The Princess Diaries with beginning to establish Hathaway as a gay icon, comparing her debut as a "reluctant princess" to that of actress Audrey Hepburn in Roman Holiday (1953). The film is credited with reviving Andrews' film career and introducing her to a younger generation of fans, rivaling her career-defining performances in Mary Poppins and The Sound of Music (1965) in terms of popularity. The film's popularity is credited with "catapult[ing] Cabot from writer to celebrity". Cabot remarked that the novels had actually been intended for slightly older readers, but parents who saw the G-rated film would purchase the books for their 6-7-year-old children, unintentionally exposing them to teen content.

When Marshall died in July 2016, several cast members paid tribute to the late director online. Following Marshall's death, The Daily Telegraph film critic Robbie Collin wrote that The Princess Diaries is "by no means a flawless movie", but rather "one from which a star was able to bounce out, eyes bright, teeth flashing and primed for adoration. Marshall’s films may never have made him a critical darling, but his best work thrived on smile power – on both the faces of his audience and cast." When the film was released on Netflix in 2018, the streaming service tweeted their surprise at the revelation that Houston served as a producer on the film, inspiring several Twitter users to comment the same. The film's popularity among audiences has since defied expectations initially indicated by its lukewarm reception nearly two decades after its release. Observing that the film experienced a renaissance in 2018, Walsingham credits the film's resurgence to its release on Netflix and American actress Meghan Markle's marriage to Prince Harry, whose narrative has been compared to Mia's role in The Princess Diaries'' in the media, particularly the fact that Markle underwent "duchess training" for the title.

References

External links

 
 
 
 
 
 
 

The Princess Diaries
2001 films
2001 romantic comedy films
2000s coming-of-age comedy films
2000s feminist films
2000s high school films
2000s teen comedy films
2000s teen romance films
American coming-of-age comedy films
American feminist comedy films
American high school films
American romantic comedy films
American teen comedy films
American teen romance films
Coming-of-age romance films
2000s English-language films
Films about princesses
Films about royalty
Films based on American novels
Films based on children's books
Films based on young adult literature
Films directed by Garry Marshall
Films scored by John Debney
Films set in Europe
Films set in San Francisco
Films set in a fictional country
Films shot in Los Angeles
Films shot in San Francisco
Films shot in Wiltshire
Walt Disney Pictures films
2000s American films